30 (thirty) is the natural number following 29 and preceding 31.

In mathematics

30 is an even, composite, pronic number. With 2, 3, and 5 as its prime factors, it is a regular number and the first sphenic number, the smallest of the form , where  is a prime greater than 3. It has an aliquot sum of 42, which is the second sphenic number.

It is also:
 A semiperfect number, since adding some subsets of its divisors (e.g., 5, 10 and 15) equals 30.
 A primorial.
 A Harshad number in decimal.
 Divisible by the number of prime numbers (10) below it.
 The largest number such that all coprimes smaller than itself, except for 1, are prime.
 The sum of the first four squares, making it a square pyramidal number.
 The number of vertices in the Tutte–Coxeter graph.
 The measure of the central angle and exterior angle of a dodecagon, which is the petrie polygon of the 24-cell.
 The number of sides of a triacontagon, which in turn is the petrie polygon of the 120-cell and 600-cell.
 The number of sides of a dodecahedron and icosahedron, of vertices of an icosidodecahedron, and of faces of a rhombic dodecahedron.
 The sum of the number of elements of a 5-cell: 5 vertices, 10 edges, 10 faces, and 5 cells.
 The Coxeter number of E8.

Furthermore,

In a group , such that , where  does not divide , and has a subgroup of order , 30 is the only number less than 60 that is neither a prime nor of the aforementioned form. Therefore, 30 is the only candidate for the order of a simple group less than 60, in which one needs other methods to specifically reject to eventually deduce said order.

The SI prefix for 1030 is Quetta- (Q), and for 10−30 (i.e., the reciprocal of 1030) quecto (q). These numbers are the largest and smallest number to receive an SI prefix to date.

In science
 The atomic number of zinc is 30.

Astronomy
 Messier object M30, a magnitude 8.5 globular cluster in the constellation Capricornus
 The New General Catalogue object NGC 30, a double star in the constellation Pegasus

Age 30
 The minimum age for United States senators.
 In some regions of the continental United States, the 30th birthday is celebrated by gifting sticks.

In other fields
Thirty is:
 Used (as –30–) to indicate the end of a newspaper (or broadcast) story, a copy editor's typographical notation
 The number of days in the months April, June, September and November (and in unusual circumstances February—see February 30)
 The total number of major and minor keys in Western tonal music, including enharmonic equivalents
 In years of marriage, the pearl wedding anniversary
 The duration in years of the Thirty Years' War - 1618 to 1648
 The code for international direct dial phone calls to Greece
 The house number of 30 St Mary Axe (The Gherkin)
 The number of tracks on The Beatles' eponymous album, usually known as The White Album
 A stage in young adulthood
 Part of the name of:
 30 Odd Foot of Grunts, the band fronted by actor Russell Crowe
 The movie title 13 Going on 30, starring Jennifer Garner
 The title of the Food Network show 30 Minute Meals
 30 Days of Night, a comic book miniseries and film
 Judas Iscariot betrayed Jesus for 30 pieces of silver (Matthew 26:15)
 The number of the French department Gard
 Number of letters in Bulgarian alphabet
 Number of letters in Serbian alphabet
 30 was the route number of the bus blown up by terrorists in Tavistock Square during the 7 July 2005 London bombings.

History and literature
 At about age 30 (according to Luke 3:23), Jesus of Nazareth was baptized by John the Baptist, signaling the beginning of his public ministry of teaching and healing. It was also the age when David became King (2 Samuel 5:4) and Ezekiel and John the Baptist began their own ministries, (based on Ezekiel 1:1 and John the Baptist's age in comparison to Jesus.)
 Age 30 is when Jewish priests traditionally start their service (according to Numbers 4:3).
 One of the rallying cries of the 1960s student/youth protest movement was the slogan, "Don't trust anyone over thirty".
 In The Myth of Sisyphus the French existentialist Albert Camus comments that the age of thirty is a crucial period in the life of a man, for at that age he gains a new awareness of the meaning of time.
 In Franz Kafka's novel The Trial Joseph wakes up on the morning of his thirtieth birthday to find himself under arrest for an unspecified crime. After making many futile attempts to find the nature of the crime or the name of his accuser, Joseph dies on the eve of his thirty-first birthday.
 The number of uprights that formed the Sarsen Circle at Stonehenge, also the supposed number of holes forming the arrays of Y and Z Holes at Stonehenge.
 Western Christianity's most prolific 20th-century essayist, F. W. Boreham in 'Life at Thirty' ('Cliffs of Opal') mentions that in addition to Jesus commencing ministry at 30 (Luke 3:23), Joseph was 30 when he stood before Pharaoh, King of Egypt (Genesis 41:46), King David was 30 when he began to reign (2 Samuel 5:4), and the Levites were numbered from the age of 30 and upward  (1 Chronicles 23:3). Also in that essay Boreham writes "It was said of [the English poet] Keats, that 'he ensphered himself in thirty perfect years and died, not young'."

Sports
 In tennis, the number 30 represents the second point gained in a game.
 In baseball, 30 is the number of teams in Major League Baseball.
 In basketball, there are 30 teams in the National Basketball Association.

Music

 The number of variations in Bach's Goldberg Variations
 30, a 2001 album by Harry Connick, Jr.
 Thirty Seconds to Mars, an American rock band
 "30 Minutes", a song by t.A.T.u
 Thirty, a 2013 album by Anthony Callea
 XXX, an album by Danny Brown
 30, a 2021 album by Adele

See also
 List of highways numbered 30

References

Integers